Greg Child (born 12 April 1957) is an Australian-born rock climber, mountaineer, author and filmmaker.

He has authored several books: Thin Air: Encounters in the Himalayas, Mixed Emotions: Mountaineering Writings of Greg Child, Postcards from the Ledge, Over the Edge and Climbing Free (co-authored with Lynn Hill), and has written numerous magazine articles for "Outside", "Climbing", "Rock and Ice" and "Men's Journal". In 1987, Child was honoured with the American Alpine Club's Literary Award for his prolific and insightful mountaineering literature. In 2011 Child was President of the Jury for mountaineering's coveted Piolet d'Or.

Notable ascents
1981 Aurora, (VI 5.8 A5, 900m), El Capitan, Yosemite Valley, USA. FA with Peter Mayfield.
1985 Lost in America, (VI 5.9 A5, 900m), El Capitan, Yosemite Valley, USA. FA with Randy Leavitt.
1986 Northwest Ridge, Gasherbrum IV, Karakoram. FA of the Northwest Ridge (second ascent of Gash IV) with Tim Macartney-Snape and Tom Hargis.
1990 K2 successful climb with Steve Swenson and Greg Mortimer and others, per lecture and slides at Harvard Traveler's Club, 21 May 2013
1992 Run for Cover, (VII 5.11 A3, 1000m), Trango Tower, Karakoram, Pakistan.  FA with Mark Wilford.
1994 Belligerence, (VI 5.11 A3+ 1200m), Mount Combatant, Coast Mountains (B.C. Canada).  FA with Greg Collum and Steve Mascioli.
1994 Wall of Shadows, (Alaska Grade 6, AI6+ 5.9 A4), Mount Hunter, Alaska Range Alaska, USA.  FA with Michael Kennedy.

Writings
 1987: 
 1987: 
 1988: Thin Air: Encounters in the Himalaya, Mountaineers Books, Seattle, WA, USA. 1988 , 
 1993: Mixed Emotions: Mountaineering Writings, Mountaineers Books, Seattle, WA, USA. 1993 
 1998: Postcards from the Ledge, Mountaineers Books, Seattle, WA, USA. 1998  (Winner National Outdoor Book Award, Outdoor Literature, 1998)
 2002: Over the Edge, Villard Books (Random House), New York, New York, USA.  2002

References

1957 births
Australian mountain climbers
Australian non-fiction writers
Living people